Crunwere ( - also written Crunwear and Cronwere) is a hamlet and parish in Pembrokeshire, Wales.  It is situated 3 km north of the Carmarthen Bay coast, 8 km north-east of Saundersfoot.  The parish includes the village of Llanteg and sub-hamlet of Llanteglos .  Together with the village of Amroth, it constitutes the community of Amroth.

Name
The Welsh placename means "round alder swamp": the English form is a corruption of the Welsh.  Part of Little England beyond Wales, although close to the Pembrokeshire language frontier, it has been predominantly English-speaking for centuries.

History
1849 Description of Parish -

Parish
The parish had an area of 689 Ha.  Its census populations were: 191 (1801): 289 (1851): 188 (1901): 160 (1951): 164 (1981). The percentage of Welsh speakers was 16 (1891): 12 (1931): 15 (1971)

Crunwere Church (St Elidyr) is now declared redundant and the last service (open-air) held on 2 August 2009.

Governance
Crunwere is included in the Amroth electoral ward for elections to Pembrokeshire County Council. Crunwere is also a community electoral ward (the other being 'Amroth') which elects or co-opts up to three community councillors to Amroth Community Council.

References

External links 

Crunwere on Genuki
Llanteg History Society

Amroth, Pembrokeshire
Pembrokeshire electoral wards
Villages in Pembrokeshire